Vic Hislop (born July 1st, 1947, in Stanthorpe, Queensland, Australia) is a former shark hunter.

Vic Hislop has dedicated most of his life to capturing and killing sharks. A 1987 photograph shows a huge  great white shark caught by Hislop. His activities have long been the subject of controversy. In the face of the increasing acceptance that sharks are an essential part of the ocean ecology, Hislop has claimed that they are God's mistake, and feels that his mission is to correct that mistake by killing them.

He has also claimed that the Australian government is covering up many fatal shark attacks by recording the deaths as drownings in order to protect tourism.

Hislop supports the protection of harmless shark species like whale sharks and sand tiger sharks.

He was responsible for catching 12 sharks for the British contemporary artist, Damien Hirst, which Hirst then incorporated into works including The Physical Impossibility of Death in the Mind of Someone Living, which was sold in 2004 for an estimated $8 million.

In 2016, Hislop closed his "Shark Show" in Hervey Bay, Queensland, after 30 years, citing personal reasons.

References

Australian hunters
Shark hunters
1950 births
Living people